Ahmed Yaslam (Arabic:أحمد يسلم) (born 8 July 1994) is an Emirati footballer who plays as a defender.

References

External links
 

Emirati footballers
1994 births
Living people
Ajman Club players
Al-Wasl F.C. players
Emirates Club players
Al Dhafra FC players
Place of birth missing (living people)
UAE Pro League players
Association football defenders